This is a list of notable people from Niagara Falls, New York.

Artists
George Barker, photographer nationally famous for Niagara Falls photos
Ruth Dicker, landscape painter
Jeremiah Goodman, illustrator
Shelley Niro, Mohawk filmmaker and visual artist
Alice Wadowski-Bak, artist, creator of wycinanki

Authors and journalists
Barbara Frum, Canadian television journalist, born in Niagara Falls, NY
Lilian Whiting, journalist, author
Jane Bryant Quinn, financial journalist

Bands, composers, and musicians
Gary Baker, Grammy Award-winning songwriter
Glen Benton, death metal musician
Robert Nathaniel Dett, composer
Richard Ray Farrell, electric blues guitarist, harmonicist, singer and songwriter, born in Niagara Falls
William Masselos, classical pianist
Chauncey Morehouse, jazz drummer
Bobby Previte, drummer and composer
Tommy Tedesco, born in Niagara Falls, most-recorded guitarist in history

Business and industry
Francis R. Delano, banker, first warden of Minnesota State Prison, first General Superintendent of St. Paul & Pacific Railway
Frank A. Dudley, former lawyer, politician, hotelier and business owner
Dawne Hickton, CEO of RTI International Metals

Entertainers and actors
R. J. Adams (Bob Shannon), actor and radio personality, attended Bishop Duffy High School
Mark Bridges, costume designer
Charles Cyphers, actor
Julie Gregg, actress
Kris Krull, beauty queen
Rachael Lillis, voice actress
April Stevens, pop singer, best known for her recording of Deep Purple with her brother Nino Tempo 
Nino Tempo, pop singer, best known for his recording of Deep Purple with his sister April Stevens 
Franchot Tone, actor, born in Niagara Falls

Military
John P. Bobo, received Medal of Honor
Peter Buell Porter, US Secretary of War

Politics and law
Earl Brydges, New York State Senator
John T. Bush, New York State Senator
John Ceretto, New York State Assemblyman
Robert H. Gittins, U.S. Congressman
George W. Grider, U.S. Congressman from Tennessee
Lorraine Hunt, Lt. Governor of Nevada
Pat E. Johnson, president of National Tang Soo Do Congress
Nancy J. King, Maryland State Senator
Joe Micon, Indiana legislator
John Moses, Illinois Assemblyman
Michael Mulligan, lead prosecutor in the courts-martial of Hasan Akbar and of Nidal Malik Hasan
Peter A. Porter, poet and village president of Niagara Falls
 Robert Restaino, current mayor of Niagara Falls NY and local attorney
Arthur Schoellkopf, mayor of Niagara Falls, New York
James S. Simmons, U.S. Congressman
Richard D. Simons, Chief Judge of New York Court of Appeals
Thomas Vincent Welch, New York State Assemblyman, first Superintendent of New York State Reservation at Niagara

Religion, charities, social advocacy
George W. Comstock, public health physician
Brent Nicholson Earle, AIDS activist
Robert Elderfield, chemist
Scott H. Faulring, historian, document editor
Lois Gibbs, environmental activist
Orange Judd, agricultural chemist
James Thomas Stevens, poet, academic

Sports
Benny Bengough, Baseball player and member of the New York Yankees first World Series title in 1923.
Dean Biasucci, NFL placekicker
David Bright, professional diver
Walter Cazen, baseball player
Adam Clendening, NHL defenseman (raised in nearby Wheatfield)
Greg Cox, NFL safety
Walter Dick, member of U.S. National Soccer Hall of Fame
Dan DeSantis, football player for Philadelphia Eagles
Rashad Evans, MMA Fighter
Jonny Flynn, NBA basketball player, Minnesota Timberwolves
William Frazer, Olympic sport shooter
Hank Gornicki, MLB player
Steve Hamilton,  NFL defensive end
Paul Harris, basketball player
Ben Hayes, MLB relief pitcher
Patrick Healey Jr., professional bowler
Ellis Hobbs, cornerback for Philadelphia Eagles
Richard Jacob, basketball coach
Daryl Johnston, NFL player
Wayne Krivsky, MLB executive
Chuck Leo, AFL player
Marc Magliarditi, hockey goaltender
Sal Maglie, baseball pitcher
Rick Manning, baseball player
Tony Marino, amateur competitive bodybuilder and power lifter
Matt Mazza, basketball player
Vince Mazza, NFL player and Canadian football all-star
Marc Mero, WWE professional wrestler
John Moir, professional basketball player
Hank Nichols, college basketball referee
Qadree Ollison, NFL running back
Johnny Pasek, baseball player
Nick Sebek, NFL quarterback
James Starks, football player for Green Bay Packers
Tara VanDerveer, women's basketball coach at Stanford
Kerry Von Erich, professional wrestler
Jesse Winker, baseball player

Other
Peter Magaddino, mobster
Stefano Magaddino, mafia boss
William Chandler Shrubsall,  inmate
Charlie Utter, American Wild West figure
Roger Woodward, went over Niagara Falls and lived in 1960 when he was 7 years old

References

Niagara Falls, New York
Niagara Falls